Rural Cellular was a telecommunications company that had run the Unicel mobile network. It operated in Midwest, Northeast, Northwest and the Southern regions of the United States and was bought by Verizon Wireless on January 25, 2009, for approximately $2.67 billion in cash and assumed debt.

External links
 Rural Cellular Corporation

Defunct mobile phone companies of the United States
Defunct companies based in Minnesota
Verizon Wireless